The athletics competition in the 1926 Central American and Caribbean Games were held in Mexico City, Mexico.

Medal summary

Men's events

Medal table

References
 
 

Athletics at the Central American and Caribbean Games
Central American and Caribbean Games
1926 CAC Games
1926 Central American and Caribbean Games
1926 in Mexican sports